The Cultural Center of Novi Sad is a cultural institution of Novi Sad, which organizes exhibitions, literary programs, workshops, art cinema programs, etc.; the biggest events are Novi Sad Jazz Festival , International Festival of Alternative and New Theater (INFANT), Euro-In Film, Prosefest, Music festival Poezika. Its founder is City's Council, and it is located in Katolička Porta, in city's center.

External links
Homepage 
Homepage 

Culture in Novi Sad
Arts organizations based in Serbia
Cultural centers